In Goa News is a Panaji based 24-hour Marathi news and entertainment television channel owned by Anil Lad. It is watched by approximately 200,000 viewers on Goa’s cable network and through internet worldwide. It is the first channel from Goa to broadcast live television on the internet. It is also available on Jio TV.

Programmes 
 Ruchik
 Healthy Living
 Test Drive
 Women In Goa
 Smart Gruhini
 Aaji Baicha Batwa

Crew 
 Anil Laad
 Yati Lad
 Akshay Lad
 Shobha Lad
 Rakesh Agarwadekar
 Sharmila Mandrekar
 Prathamesh Murgod
 Leena Bandekar
 Sagar Mulvi
 Swati Volvoikar
 Digambar Bhagat

See also
Media in Goa

References

External links 
 In Goa News website

Television stations in India
Marathi-language television channels
Konkani-language television stations